Rwanda competed at the 2020 Summer Paralympics in Tokyo, Japan, from 24 August and 5 September 2021. This was their sixth consecutive appearance at the Summer Paralympics since 2000.

Sitting volleyball 

Rwandan women's sitting volleyball team qualified for the 2020 Summer Paralympics after winning at the 2019 ParaVolley Africa Zonal Championships.

Summary

Women's tournament 

Group play

Seventh place match

See also 
 Rwanda at the Paralympics
 Rwanda at the 2020 Summer Olympics

References 

Nations at the 2020 Summer Paralympics
2020
2021 in Rwandan sport